Răzvan Marian Stanca (born 18 January 1980) is a Romanian former professional football player who played for teams such as: Sportul Studențesc, Dacia Mioveni, Pandurii Târgu Jiu or Steaua București, among others.

Career

Pandurii
In 2008, Stanca signed a contract with Liga I club, Pandurii Târgu Jiu. After 2 years, where he appeared as holder for 45 times, he was remarked and was loaned to Steaua and after to Universitatea Craiova.

Steaua
On 7 August 2010, at his Liga I debut for Steaua, against FC Brașov, he was sent off and the opposing team received a penalty kick in the 90th minute, Robert Ilyeș equalized and the match ended 1-1.

After only 2 months, because Victor Pițurcă coach resigned on round 3 of new season and the new manager no longer need his services, he was sent to the second team. Later, he was loaned to Universitatea Craiova, where he arrived after Victor Pițurcă joined the club as the general manager.

In January 2011, he returned to Steaua. He spent here 2 years and appeared as holder 13 times.

Return to Pandurii
In July 2013, Stanca returned to Pandurii.

Honours

Sportul Studențesc
Liga II: 2000–01, 2003–04

Steaua București
Cupa României: 2011
Liga I: 2012–13

References

External links

1980 births
Living people
Footballers from Bucharest
Romanian footballers
Romania international footballers
Association football goalkeepers
Liga I players
Liga II players
FCV Farul Constanța players
FC Sportul Studențesc București players
CS Mioveni players
CS Pandurii Târgu Jiu players
FC Steaua București players